Sabana Grande (Spanish: Grand Plains) may refer to:

Sabana Grande, Caracas, a district of Venezuela
Sabana Grande, Puerto Rico, a municipality of Puerto Rico
Sabana Grande de Boyá, a municipality in the Monte Plata province, Dominican Republic
Sabana Grande de Palenque, a municipality in the San Cristóbal province, Dominican Republic
Sabana Grande, Nicaragua, a municipality in the central region
Sabanagrande, Honduras
Sabanagrande, Atlántico in Colombia
Sabanagrande, Herrera, Panama
Sabanagrande, Los Santos, Panama